Al-Biruni is an impact crater that lies on the far side of the Moon, just beyond the eastern limb. This portion of the surface is sometimes brought into sight due to librations of the Moon, but due to its location the crater is viewed from the side. Al-Biruni lies to the south of the crater Joliot, and to the northeast of Goddard. It is named after the great Persian scientist Al-Biruni.

The rim of Al-Biruni forms a somewhat irregular circle, with a slight outward bulge in the northeast wall, and a somewhat wider inner wall to the west. The interior floor is relatively flat, with a few tiny smaller craters to mark the surface. The most notable of these is Al-Biruni C near the northeast wall.

Satellite craters 
By convention these features are identified on lunar maps by placing the letter on the side of the crater midpoint that is closest to Al-Biruni.

See also 
 9936 Al-Biruni, asteroid

References

External links 
 

Impact craters on the Moon
Al-Biruni